The Franco-Dutch treaty on Saint Martin border controls, sometimes shortened to the Franco-Dutch treaty and in full the Treaty between the Kingdom of the Netherlands and the French Republic on the control of persons entering Saint Martin through the airports, is a treaty between France and the Netherlands aimed at improving border controls at the two airports on the divided island of Saint Martin. The island is divided into French Saint-Martin (at the time a part of Guadeloupe) and Dutch Sint Maarten (at the time a part of the Netherlands Antilles).

The airports concerned are Princess Juliana International Airport and L'Espérance Airport.

History
The treaty was signed on 17 May 1994 in Paris, and is drawn up in both a French and Dutch original.

Ratification
Ratification proved to be difficult in the Netherlands. An advice from the Estates of the Netherlands Antilles, which said that the treaty would have negative effects on Sint Maarten's tourist industry, initially blocked the ratification. There had also been objections about the authority of the committee (see below). The parliament of the Kingdom of the Netherlands decided in 1999 to hold off ratification until Sint Maarten made its position clear. Sint Maarten's position was never made clear, however. After France put pressure on the Dutch government, the treaty was eventually ratified in 2006, much to the dismay of the leader of the People's Progressive Alliance.

Entry into force and implementation
Article 18 specifies that the treaty enters into force on the first day of the third month following a written declaration of both parties that the constitutional ratification procedure has been completed. The treaty entered into force on 1 August 2007. 

The treaty had yet to be implemented as of early 2016. The Sint Maarten government reported in January 2016 that a joint committee had been meeting, and that there was "steady progress" toward its implementation.

Provisions

The treaty allows for joint border controls to be carried out at the airports of Saint Martin. The treaty specifies that in order for an alien to be admitted to Saint Martin, he needs to have a visa (or a landing permit) for both the Dutch side and the French side. This has caused some controversy on the Dutch side, as that part has a more relaxed visa regime. The French part is an outermost region of the European Union and thus uses its visa list.

Originally, this caused nationals from thirteen countries in the Caribbean region to require visa to land on Princess Juliana Airport which they did not require before. After negotiations, France agreed to limit the additional visa requirements to four countries in the region: Dominica, Jamaica, Guyana and Suriname. There are negotiations to remove Suriname from the list as well.

Joint border controls will be executed at risk flights at both airports. The committee and the working group that have been established by article 13 will draw up a list of flights to be subjected to joint border control. Both the committee and the working group are composed of representatives from both sides and meet once a year.

Implementation is held back by Sint Maarten, whose Prime Minister Sarah Wescot-Williams said that implementation will harm tourist interests. The treaty was to be implemented on 1 April 2009, but it was postponed as the working group was still not installed.

See also
France–Netherlands border
Treaty of Concordia
Visa policy in the European Union
Visa policy of the Kingdom of the Netherlands in the Caribbean

References

External links
Sint Maarten government website
Saint-Martin government website

Saint Martin (island)
Treaties concluded in 1994
Treaties entered into force in 2007
Collectivity of Saint Martin–Sint Maarten border
France–Netherlands relations
Treaties extended to the Netherlands Antilles
Treaties extended to Guadeloupe
1994 in France